The Château de Trévarez is a stately home in the commune of Saint-Goazec in Finistère, in Brittany, France.

The former manor house was built in the 16th century (the west part) and the 17th century (the east part). The present structure was commissioned by James de Kerjégu, Chairman of the General Council of Finistère, and built at the end of the 19th century by the French architect Walter-André Destailleur.

Trévarez is one of the most recent châteaux built in France. Construction was completed around the beginning of the twentieth century. In 1941, the château was taken over by the German occupying forces. The castle was bombed on 30 July 1944 by the Royal Air Force.

Location and style
The château is located on a promontory overlooking the valley of Aulne, canalised as part of the Nantes-Brest Canal. Its architecture is a combination of traditional style and technological innovations.

Protection
The château is partly listed as a monument historique by the French Ministry of Culture. The park and gardens are also listed on the Ministry's database and are open to the public.

See also
 List of châteaux in Brittany

References

External links
 
 
 Official website of the Château de Trévarez

Châteaux in Finistère
Monuments historiques of Finistère